Stølsdalsnutane or Støylsdalsnutene is a mountain on the border of Agder and Vestfold og Telemark counties in southern Norway. The highest peak, known as Nordvestre Stølsdalsnuten, is the 7th highest peak in Agder.

The mountain sits in the Setesdalsheiene range, on the east side of the Setesdalen valley in a line of large mountains marking the county border.

See also
List of mountains of Norway

References

Mountains of Agder
Mountains of Vestfold og Telemark
Bykle
Tokke